"The Ballad of the Green Berets" is a patriotic song in the ballad style about the United States Army Special Forces. It is one of the few popular songs of the Vietnam War years to cast the military in a positive light. In 1966 it became a major hit, reaching No. 1 for five weeks on the Hot 100 and four weeks on Cashbox. It was also a crossover hit, reaching No. 1 on Billboard Easy Listening chart and No. 2 on Billboard Country survey. Billboard ranked it  in its year-end chart for 1966, while it tied for first with "California Dreamin'" by the Mamas and the Papas in Cash Box year-end rankings.

The song was written by then-Staff Sergeant or "SSG" Barry Sadler, beginning when he was training to be a Special Forces medic. The author Robin Moore, who wrote the book The Green Berets, helped Sadler write the lyrics and get a recording contract with RCA Records. The demo of the song was produced in a rudimentary recording studio at Fort Bragg, with the help of Gerry Gitell and LTG William P. Yarborough.

The lyrics were written, in part, in honor of U.S. Army Specialist 5 James Gabriel Jr., a Special Forces operator and the first native Hawaiian to die in Vietnam, who was killed by Viet Cong gunfire while on a training mission with the South Vietnamese Army on April 8, 1962. One verse mentioned Gabriel by name, but it was not used in the recorded version.

Sadler recorded the song and eleven other tunes in New York in December 1965. The song and album, Ballads of the Green Berets, were released in January 1966. He performed the song on television on January 30, 1966 on The Ed Sullivan Show, and on other TV shows including Hollywood Palace and The Jimmy Dean Show.

Popularity 
The song was the No. 1 hit in the U.S. for the five weeks, spanning March 1966; also the No. 21 song of the 1960s as ranked by Joel Whitburn. The single sold more than nine million copies; the album, more than two million. 

"The Ballad of the Green Berets" is currently used as one of the four primary marching tunes of the Fightin' Texas Aggie Band.

In film 
The song is heard in a choral rendition by Ken Darby in the 1968 John Wayne film The Green Berets, based on Robin Moore's book. The film's score was not released as an album until Film Score Monthly released it in 2005. A movie tie-in featuring artwork from the film and a cover version by Ennio Morricone was released in Europe, though the album's other tracks were from A Fistful of Dollars and For a Few Dollars More. In The Many Saints of Newark, while Dickie Moltisanti is driving over in his car to meet Harold McBrayer for the first time, "The Ballad of the Green Berets" is playing on the radio.

The cast of the 2018 movie 12 Strong sing the tune as their Chinook helicopter takes off.

This song is featured in the 1979 film More American Graffiti, during the first sequence of Terry the Toad's New Year's Eve in 1965 Vietnam.

Other versions derivatives 
Many other American recording artists did their own versions of the song ranging from Kate Smith and Duane Eddy to unknown artists singing on various drugstore records.

Many versions in other languages are rewritten to reference local units; these include:

 A German version (Hundert Mann und ein Befehl), sung by Freddy Quinn and later again by Heidi Brühl had considerable success in Germany. The German version is a song against the war. It rejects any sacrifice, not only for the son, but for the father as well. Freddy Quinn sings the song from the point of view of a reluctant but forced soldier, Heidi Brühl from the point of view of the crying girlfriend of the soldier. Freddy Quinn's version was later recorded by Welle: Erdball and also by Cryptic Wintermoon.
 The Royal Netherlands Army's Korps Commandotroepen (KCT) use the original lyrics with a couples changes referencing the Netherlands. This version is sung to recruits who have successfully completed the harsh Basic Commando Training (ECO), and who receive their Green Beret.
 The Residents recorded a cover of the song for the album The Third Reich 'n Roll as a part of "Hitler was a Vegetarian"
 Rhodesian singer-songwriter John Edmond recorded the "Ballad of the Green Berets" with reference to the soldiers of the Rhodesian Light Infantry (RLI), commando-style fireforce units of Rhodesian Security Forces who wore berets of green color, with a slight difference in the chorus, saying "These are men, of The Fatherland’s Best." & "Make him one of The Fatherlands best" A "Ballad of the Red Beret" was sung by the Rhodesian Ministry of Internal Affairs at their battlecamp in Chikurubi. In South Africa, the "Ballad of the Green Berets" was recorded as the "Ballad of the Maroon Berets". The Maroon beret is a symbol of the South African Special Forces Brigade and the South African 44 Parachute Regiment. Also this song was re-recorded by South African opera singer Leonore Veenemans as "My Land Suid-Afrika".
 The Swedish version "Balladen om den blå baskern" is a salute to the Swedish soldiers serving in the United Nations' peace-keeping forces (the Blue Berets). It was sung by Anita Lindblom.
 The Italian version is called La Ballata del Soldato, sung by Quartetto Cetra.
 Since 2004, the Infantry Officer's School of the Swiss Armed Forces uses a quadrlingual (German, French, Italian and Rumansch) version of the song, Die Infanterieballade (The Infantry Ballad), as their anthem. The lyrics were written by cadets from all linguistical regions of Switzerland. It is sung everyday onwards to the morning roll call, before the National Anthem.
 In 1966, Bernard Tapy (real name Bernard Tapie, businessman and politician), recorded an adaptation in French as "Passeport pour le soleil"
 The Ukrainian version 2015 100 Soldiers. Lyrics by Oleksa Negrebetskiy.
 The Finnish version titled "Balladi punaisista bareteista" was released in 1966 by Kivikasvot.

Parodies or humorous use 

 The melody and rhyme pattern were adapted by Filipino musician Eddie Tallada recording the Ballad of Subic Bay describing Vietnam war sailors' liberty in the town of Olongapo adjacent to the Subic Bay Naval Base.
 In 1968, The Beach Bums, an ad hoc group featuring a young Bob Seger, recorded "The Ballad of the Yellow Beret", chronicling the adventures of a draft dodger.  The record was withdrawn after a cease and desist letter from Sadler.
 The Residents parodied the song on their Third Reich & Roll album.
 Another parody was used on an episode of Saturday Night Live that William Shatner hosted in 1986, called "Ollie North, The Mute Marine". Shatner participated in the sketch, outfitted in a USMC Class A uniform, alluding to Oliver North's refusal to speak about his participation in the Iran-Contra Affair; Shatner spoke no words.
 The song is used to humorous effect in Michael Moore's film Canadian Bacon as ill-informed Americans prepare for an invasion by Canada.
 In the film Caddyshack, Bill Murray mumbles the song under his breath while he is connecting the wires to the plunger as he prepares for his final battle with his gopher nemesis.
 In an episode of Cheers, Cliff Clavin aborts his plans to emigrate to Canada with his love interest when Sam, Woody, and Frasier appeal to his patriotic side by singing the song.

Charts

All-time charts

References

Further reading 
 Collins, Ace (2003). Songs Sung, Red, White, and Blue: The Stories Behind America's Best-Loved Patriotic Songs.  HarperResource.  .

External links 
 Ballad of the Green Berets: The Life and Wars of Army Staff Sergeant Barry Sadler by Marc Leepson (Stackpole Books, 2017)
 [ Ballads of the Green Berets] at AllMusic
 "Soon This Will Pass" sung by Joan Gibbs at Barbara Joan Gushin

Songs of the Vietnam War
American patriotic songs
Pop ballads
Barry Sadler songs
Billboard Hot 100 number-one singles
Cashbox number-one singles
Number-one singles in South Africa
Songs about the military
1966 singles
1966 songs
Anita Lindblom songs
RCA Victor singles